Interesting Times is the third album by High Tide. Two original members, Tony Hill and Simon House, reformed the name. It was originally released as a mail order cassette, and later reissued on CD and vinyl with two bonus tracks.

Track listing

^Bonus tracks on 2003 reissue

Personnel 
Tony Hill - vocals, guitars, bass
Simon House - electric violin, keyboards, drum machine, mandolin, bass

References

1989 albums
High Tide (band) albums